Isotropic radiation is radiation that has the same intensity regardless of the direction of measurement, such as would be found in a thermal cavity. The radiation may be electromagnetic, sound or may be composed of elementary particles.

Radiation